The name Vinta has been used for three tropical cyclones in the Philippines by PAGASA in the Western Pacific Ocean. It was named after the Vinta outrigger boat from Mindanao.

 Typhoon Nida (2009) (T0922, 26W, Vinta) – Powerful Category 5 super typhoon that remained over the open ocean.
 Typhoon Krosa (2013) (T1329, 29W, Vinta) – struck the Philippines.
 Typhoon Tembin (2017) (T1727, 33W, Vinta) – caused 266 deaths in the Philippines.
The name Vinta was retired from use in the Philippine area of responsibility following the 2017 typhoon season and replaced with Verbena.

Pacific typhoon set index articles